Rachel Beale (born 9 July 1983 in Gisborne, New Zealand) is a New Zealand netball player. Beale played with the Waikato Bay of Plenty Magic for the 2008 ANZ Championship season. She was not signed for the 2009 season, but later that year Beale accepted an offer from Leeds Carnegie to play in the 2009–10 Netball Superleague. 
Rachel has also represented New Zealand in Kayaking and Surf Life Saving, adding many national and international medals to her belt.

References

New Zealand netball players
Waikato Bay of Plenty Magic players
ANZ Championship players
Sportspeople from Gisborne, New Zealand
1983 births
Living people
Netball Superleague players
Yorkshire Jets players
New Zealand expatriate netball people in England